Waitress is a musical with music and lyrics by Sara Bareilles and a book by Jessie Nelson. The musical is based on the 2007 film of the same name, written by Adrienne Shelly. It tells the story of Jenna Hunterson, a baker and waitress in an abusive relationship with her husband, Earl. After Jenna unexpectedly becomes pregnant, she begins an affair with her doctor, Dr. James (Jim) Pomatter. Looking for ways out of her troubles, she sees a pie baking contest and its grand prize as her chance.

After a tryout at the American Repertory Theater in Cambridge, Massachusetts, in August 2015, Waitress premiered at the Brooks Atkinson Theatre on Broadway in April 2016 with direction by Diane Paulus and starring Jessie Mueller as Jenna. A U.S. national tour ran from 2017 to 2019. From 2019 to 2020, the musical played at the Adelphi Theatre in London's West End. In September 2021, it returned to Broadway for a limited engagement at the Ethel Barrymore Theatre starring Sara Bareilles as Jenna, mainly to produce a live stage recording of the show for a future public release.

Background
The musical is based on the 2007 indie film Waitress. The film was produced on a budget of just $1.5 million, earning over $23 million in global box office receipts. The film starred Keri Russell and was written and directed by Adrienne Shelly. The film follows Jenna, a waitress and pie chef living in the American South, who unexpectedly becomes pregnant and feels trapped in an unhappy marriage. Looking for a way out, she sees a pie contest and its grand prize as her chance.

Following the 2013 Tony Awards, producers Barry and Fran Weissler announced that a musical version of the film was in the works, with Paula Vogel writing the book, Sara Bareilles writing the music and lyrics, and direction by Diane Paulus. The Weisslers purchased the stage rights to the film shortly after its release in 2007. Paula Vogel withdrew from the project in January 2014. On December 11, 2014, the musical was officially confirmed, and it was announced that the show would receive its world premiere at the American Repertory Theater in Cambridge, Massachusetts, as part of their 2015–2016 season, with Jessie Nelson now writing the book. A workshop was held the same month in New York City, with Jessie Mueller, Keala Settle, Barrett Wilbert Weed, Christopher Fitzgerald, Bryce Pinkham, and Andy Karl, among others, taking part. Nelson, with the blessing of the late Adrienne Shelly's husband, used some of Shelly's unfinished scripts to help bring "her voice" to the project.

Waitress has a rare all-women production team, with Diane Paulus as director, Sara Bareilles as composer and lyricist, Jessie Nelson as book adaptor and Lorin Latarro as choreographer. The Clinton Foundation honored the show's all female team by launching the #CeilingBreaker campaign and distributing free tickets.

Productions

Cambridge, Massachusetts (2015) 
Waitress began previews at the American Repertory Theater in Cambridge, Massachusetts, on August 2, 2015, before the official opening on August 19, 2015, for a limited run to September 27, 2015. Tickets for the production sold out. The show was directed by Diane Paulus, with choreography by Chase Brock, set design by Scott Pask, costume design by Suttirat Anne Larlarb, lighting design by Kenneth Posner, musical direction by Nadia DiGiallonardo, and sound by Jonathan Deans. The cast featured Jessie Mueller as Jenna, Drew Gehling as Jim, Joe Tippett as Earl, Jeanna de Waal as Dawn, Keala Settle as Becky, Dakin Matthews as Joe, Jeremy Morse as Ogie, and Eric Anderson as Cal.

Broadway (2016–2020, 2021–2022) 
Broadway previews began on March 25, 2016, at the Brooks Atkinson Theatre, with the official opening on April 24, just in time for the April 28 Tony Awards cut-off date. Lorin Latarro replaced Brock as choreographer and Christopher Akerlind replaced Posner as lighting designer. For the Broadway production, elements of the book were rewritten, new choreography developed, and a new song written by Bareilles. Manhattan baker Stacy Donnelly and Small Business Owner Dawn Mayo of Everythingdawn were hired to ensure that the baking scenes were realistic. Donnelly taught the cast how to work and roll pie dough, as the role of Jenna required Mueller to crack eggs, sift flour, and roll out dough on stage. Mayo created all of the prop pies used in the show. Al Roker played the role of Joe twice since 2018.

To help immerse audiences, real pies are warming as they enter the theater, creating the aroma of a pie shop; slices of pie are for sale. Cast changes included Nick Cordero taking over the role of Earl, Kimiko Glenn as Dawn, and Christopher Fitzgerald, who took part in the New York workshop, as Ogie. During previews, the production set a new box-office record for a single performance at the Brooks Atkinson Theatre, taking in $145,532. The production had required an initial investment of $12 million. During a technical halt at a preview performance, composer and lyricist Sara Bareilles performed two songs, including "Down at the Diner", previously cut from the production.

Waitress made history on Broadway with the four top creative spots in a show being filled by women (Bareilles, Nelson, Latarro, and Paulus). In addition, the costume designer and musical director were women. Bareilles said she was proud to be part of an all-female team: "It's really fun to be an example of the way it can look. We're a bunch of women who are deeply committed to finding a way to build a unified vision." Only the 1978 Broadway musical Runaways had a similar history, with book, music, lyrics, choreography and direction all by Elizabeth Swados.

The production closed on January 5, 2020, after 33 previews and 1,544 regular performances. On May 5, 2021, Barry Weissler announced that a remount of the original production, once again starring Bareilles, would open following the reopening of Broadway theatres.

The show returned in a limited engagement on September 2, 2021 at the Ethel Barrymore Theatre, making it the first musical on Broadway to begin performances following the COVID-19 shutdown. The primary reason for its return was to record the production for a future public release, with STEAM Motion + Sound producing the film. Several returning cast members star in the production, including Bareilles as Jenna, Gehling as Dr. Pomatter, Tippett as Earl, Dawson as Becky, Houlahan as Dawn, Matthews as Joe, Fitzgerald as Ogie, and Anderson as Cal. The run concluded on December 22, 2021, two weeks earlier than planned due to a spike of COVID-19.

U.S. national tours (2017–present) 
The first U.S. national tour, with Desi Oakley as Jenna, Lenne Klingaman as Dawn, Charity Angel Dawson as Becky, and Bryan Fenkart as Dr. Pomatter, began at Playhouse Square in Cleveland on October 20, 2017, and closed on August 18, 2019. The second non-Equity national tour, starring Bailey McCall as Jenna, Kennedy Salters as Becky, Gabriella Marzetta as Dawn, and David Socolar as Dr. Pomatter, opened on November 12, 2019, and was scheduled to continue through June 28, 2020. Because of the 2020 COVID-19 pandemic, many performances have been cancelled or rescheduled through July, 2021.

West End (2019–2020) 
The production opened in London's West End on March 7, 2019, following previews which began on February 8, at the Adelphi Theatre and featured Katharine McPhee, who had previously played the role on Broadway, as Jenna and Jack McBrayer as Ogie. Lucie Jones took over the role of Jenna on June 17, 2019. 
Desi Oakley made a return to the show in London as Jenna after playing the role on the U.S. tour for a two-week period beginning January 13. This was when Jones as well as her understudies, Sarah O’Connor and Olivia Moore, were ill and therefore unable to perform. Bareilles and Gavin Creel reunited in London on January 28, 2020. Though set to have an eight-week engagement, they left London after their performance on 14 March due to travel restrictions imposed during the COVID-19 pandemic.

The production was scheduled to end on July 4, 2020, but it closed on March 14, when West End theatres shut down due to the COVID-19 pandemic; the producers later announced the show would not re-open. Jones was due to return following Bareilles's run.

UK and Ireland tour (2021–22) 
Following the West End run, the production was scheduled to tour the UK and Ireland beginning in November 2020, however due to the ongoing COVID-19 pandemic, the tour will now begin on 4 September 2021 at the New Wimbledon Theatre with dates scheduled until 20 August 2022 at the Theatre Royal, Norwich. Lucie Jones, Sandra Marvin and Evelyn Hoskins will reprise the roles of Jenna, Becky and Dawn from the West End production. Also Matt Willis will star as Dr Pomatter. Cal will be played by Christopher D Hunt. During 2022 the Role of Jenna will be played by Chelsea Halfpenny.

International productions 
The first international production, produced by Atlantis Theatrical Entertainment Group, debuted in November 2018 at the Carlos P. Romulo Auditorium in Manila, Philippines, featuring Joanna Ampil as Jenna. It was the show's first non-replica production.

A Spanish language production (locally translated as ) debuted in Buenos Aires, Argentina, at the Metropolitan Sura Theatre on April 17, 2019, and featured Josefina Scaglione, Tony Awards nominee for the 2009 West Side Story Broadway revival, as Jenna (locally translated to Gina). The Spanish translation was done by Lily Ann Martin and Pablo del Campo. The production closed on August 4, 2019.

The Gordon Frost Organisation is planning a production to open in 2020 at the Lyric Theatre in Sydney. Casting and dates are to be announced. 
Another production is planned to play in the Netherlands featuring Willemijn Verkaik as Jenna and Jonathan Demoor as Dr. Pomatter. It was planned to open in 2020, however due to the ongoing COVID-19 pandemic, it was postponed to a not-yet-decided date. Refunds have been issued to ticket holders. The production is then planned to tour across the country.

Sponsored and produced by Toho, Fuji Television and Kyodo Tokyo, a Japanese production of Waitress the Musical premiered in Tokyo, Japan on 9 March 2021 at the Nissay Theatre. It is the first production to open since the global lockdown of COVID-19 pandemic. The show stars Mitsuki Takahata as Jenna and Mamoru Miyano as Dr. Pomatter and plans on touring in 3 other Japanese cities until May 2021. Due to COVID-19 restrictions, part of the show's creative team travelled to Japan and quarantined before the start of the rehearsal process, while others worked remotely.

A Danish-language production was set to open at the Det Ny Teater in Copenhagen in March 2021, starring Maria Lucia Rosenberg as Jenna and Lars Mølsted as Dr. Pomatter. Due to COVID-19 pandemic, the show has been delayed to April 2021 and is set to close in May 2021. The show was translated to Danish by renowned translator Kenneth ThordalIt. The Danish production will be the third non-replica production.

On July 3, 2020, Teatr Muzyczny Roma in Warsaw, Poland, announced the Polish production in 2020/2021 season. It will be the fourth non-replica production worldwide, and Polish is the third language into which the show will be translated. Translated by Michał Wojnarowski, the production was scheduled to open in April 2021 but was postponed due to COVID-19 pandemic. The opening night was on May 30, 2021.

Synopsis

Act I 
Jenna is a waitress and expert pie baker at Joe's Diner in the American South who imagines tough situations as pie ingredients ("What's Inside"). She begins another day at the diner with her boss Cal and waitresses Becky and Dawn ("Opening Up"). After she almost throws up, Becky and Dawn convince her to take a pregnancy test which, to Jenna's dismay, comes back positive due to a drunken night with her abusive husband, Earl ("The Negative"). Earl comes to the diner and suggests he may make Jenna quit and give up her passion for baking. He takes the tips she's earned from working so far that day. She decides not to tell him about the pregnancy and recalls her late mother, who also found solace from an unhappy marriage in baking ("What Baking Can Do").

At her OB/GYN's office, Jenna is taunted by other pregnant women ("Club Knocked Up") and meets Dr. Jim Pomatter, a new doctor from Connecticut. Jenna explains she does not want her baby but is going to keep it, and leaves Dr. Pomatter with a Mermaid Marshmallow pie, which, despite the fact that he is off sugar, he eats and loves ("Pomatter Pie").

Word of Jenna's pregnancy reaches Joe, the diner's curmudgeonly owner, who suggests she enter a local pie-baking contest with a large reward which would allow her to leave her husband. Dawn has turned to online dating but is terrified of the possibilities ("When He Sees Me").

Jenna runs into Dr. Pomatter at the bus stop. He compliments her pie, saying it could "win contests and ribbons and things". ("It Only Takes a Taste"). Jenna arrives home to learn Earl has been fired. He berates her, and his anger almost turns physical until she confesses she is pregnant. Earl makes her promise not to love the baby more than she loves him ("You Will Still Be Mine"). Jenna tells Dawn and Becky her plan to enter the pie contest and use the winnings to leave Earl for a new life with the baby. The three waitresses see their dreams of a better life within reach ("A Soft Place to Land"). Jenna begins to give Earl only half her earnings, hiding the other half around the house in order to save up for entering the pie contest.

Dawn's date Ogie visits the diner and insists he get to know Dawn better ("Never Ever Getting Rid of Me"). Dawn and Ogie realize they both enjoy American Revolution reenactments and how much they have in common. Jenna makes an appointment with Dr. Pomatter, where she impulsively kisses him. Though both are married, they decide to escape their frustrating lives, and have sex in his office ("Bad Idea").

Act II 
After her tryst, Jenna discovers Becky and Cal making out at the diner. The married Becky is unashamed of giving in to passion ("I Didn't Plan It"). Jenna and Dr. Pomatter continue their affair, as do Becky and Cal, and Dawn and Ogie ("Bad Idea (Reprise)"). Jenna wonders if their affair is a mistake, but Dr. Pomatter reassures her. She begins writing a mental note to her baby ("You Matter to Me").

Several months pass and Dawn and Ogie marry ("I Love You Like a Table"). At the reception, Jenna asks if Cal, despite his affair, is truly happy; he responds that he is "happy enough." Joe tells Jenna his sincere hopes for her ("Take It from an Old Man"). Earl drags Jenna home and uncovers the money she has been hiding. She meekly tells him she has been saving for the baby, but Earl leaves with the money ("Dear Baby"). Jenna breaks down, lamenting her long-lost control over her life ("She Used to Be Mine").

Jenna goes into labor ("Contraction Ballet"). She sees Joe at the hospital on his way to surgery; knowing he is dying, he gives her an envelope to open later. Earl, Becky and Dawn, and even Dr. Pomatter's wife, who is a resident at the hospital, crowd the delivery room, and Jenna cries out in distress, giving birth in darkness. She names her daughter Lulu. Earl reminds her of her promise not to love Lulu more than him, and Jenna finally tells him she wants a divorce. He reacts poorly, and she vows to flatten him if she ever sees him again. Dr. Pomatter visits Jenna alone in her room, but Jenna refuses his kiss. Saying she doesn't want to remain "happy enough", she ends the affair. As thanks for his positive impact on her life, she gives him a moon pie. Jenna remarks on her change in outlook with Lulu in her life ("Everything Changes").

Jenna opens Joe's note to discover he has left her the diner, asking her to name a pie after him. A few years later, the diner has been rechristened "Lulu's Pies" and Jenna, the owner and head chef, is content that her life has finally turned around ("Opening Up (Finale)").

Music
Waitress features an original score, with music and lyrics by American singer-songwriter Sara Bareilles. Nadia DiGiallonardo orchestrated the show and conducted the original Broadway orchestra. The musical uses a six-member orchestra consisting of keyboard, piano, cello, guitar, bass, and drums. In addition to the show's musical numbers, Bareilles also recorded the "turn off your cellphone" message, rewriting part of her original song "Cassiopeia".

Musical numbers 
 2016 Broadway Production

 Act I
 "What's Inside" – Jenna and Ensemble
 "Opening Up" – Jenna, Becky, Dawn, Cal and Company
 "The Negative" – Becky, Dawn and Jenna
 "What Baking Can Do" – Jenna and Ensemble
 "Club Knocked Up" – Female Ensemble
 "Pomatter Pie" – Band †
 "When He Sees Me" – Dawn
 "It Only Takes a Taste" – Dr. Pomatter and Jenna
 "You Will Still Be Mine" – Earl and Jenna
 "A Soft Place to Land" – Jenna, Becky and Dawn
 "Never Ever Getting Rid of Me" – Ogie and Ensemble
 "Bad Idea" – Jenna, Dr. Pomatter and Ensemble

 Act II
 "I Didn't Plan It" – Becky
 "Bad Idea" (Reprise) – Jenna, Dr. Pomatter, Becky, Cal, Dawn, Ogie and Ensemble
 "You Matter to Me" – Dr. Pomatter and Jenna
 "I Love You Like a Table" – Ogie, Dawn and Ensemble
 "Take It From an Old Man/Ma'am" – Joe/Josie and Ensemble‡
 "Dear Baby" – Jenna †
 "She Used to Be Mine" – Jenna
 "Contraction Ballet" – Jenna and Company †
 "What's Inside (Reprise)" – Company †*
 "Everything Changes" – Jenna, Becky, Dawn and Company
 "Opening Up" (Finale) – Company

† Not included on Original Broadway Playbill.

*Not included on Original Broadway Cast Recording.

‡ When June Squibb entered the cast of Waitress on Broadway in 2018, she was announced to be playing "Josie" (the gender-modified character name of "Joe"). In return, the song title and all frequent uses of the word "Man" was changed to "Ma'am" for her performance run.

Recordings
Bareilles recorded her fifth studio album, What's Inside: Songs from Waitress, featuring songs from the musical. It was released through Epic Records on November 6, 2015. The album debuted at number ten on the U.S. Billboard 200 chart with 30,000 equivalent album units in its first week of release, giving Barellies her fifth top-ten album. The lead single from the album, "She Used to Be Mine", was released digitally on September 25, 2015.<ref>{{cite web|last1=Gans|first1=Andrew|last2=Viagas|first2=Robert|date=25 September 2015|title=Listen to Sara Bareilles Single from 'What's Inside: Songs from Waitress|url=http://www.playbill.com/article/make-it-mine-listen-to-sara-bareilles-single-from-whats-inside-songs-from-waitress-com-364212|url-status=live|access-date=3 April 2016|work=Playbill}}</ref> Speaking about the release of the album, Bareilles stated that her decision to record an album of the songs came because it "proved impossible for me to imagine handing over the songs to the show before selfishly finding a way to sing them myself."

The original Broadway cast recording was released as a digital download on June 3, and the physical release followed on July 1, 2016. The album was produced by Bareilles with Neal Avron and recorded by DMI Soundtracks.

Track listing

Characters

Casts
The characters and original casts:

Notable Broadway (2016-20) replacements

 Jenna Hunterson: Sara Bareilles, Betsy Wolfe, Katharine McPhee, Nicolette Robinson, Shoshana Bean, Alison Luff, Jordin Sparks
 Dr. Jim Pomatter: Chris Diamantopoulos, Jason Mraz, Erich Bergen, Gavin Creel, Joey McIntyre, Jeremy Jordan, Mark Evans 
 Earl Hunterson: Will Swenson, Joe Tippett
 Dawn: Jenna Ushkowitz, Katie Lowes, Colleen Ballinger
 Joe/Josie: John Cullum, Bill Nolte, Lee Wilkof, Al Roker, June Squibb, Larry Marshall
 Ogie: Alex Wyse, Eddie Jemison (reprising his role from the film), Noah Galvin, Todrick Hall,

Notable Broadway restaging (2021) replacements
 Jenna Hunterson: Jennifer Nettles, Ciara Renée
 Dr. Jim Pomatter: Erich Bergen, Joshua Henry
 Ogie: Nik Dodani

Notable West End/UK Tour replacements
 Jenna Hunterson: Lucie Jones, Sara Bareilles, Desi Oakley, Chelsea Halfpenny
 Dr. Jim Pomatter: Gavin Creel
 Dawn: Ashley Roberts, Hannah Tointon, Evelyn Hoskins
 Ogie:''' Blake Harrison, Joe Sugg

Critical response
The show garnered generally mixed-to-positive reviews in both runs. Frank Rizzo, reviewing the Boston production for Variety, wrote: "...making Earl so relentlessly horrible makes Jenna's inability to leave him not just indecisive but something more worrisome... Meanwhile, there's little evidence for the good doctor being Jenna's lost soulmate, despite his loving bedside manner... Mueller's performance transcends the show's imperfections. She's funny, frisky and likable. She sings Bareilles' songs beautifully... director Diane Paulus fills the production with clever touches – a scalloped pie-crust proscenium, a fluid and easygoing flow and a natural truthfulness in the performances."

For the Broadway production, many critics found Bareilles' score and Mueller's performance to be the highlights of the show. Charles Isherwood of The New York Times gave a mixed review of the show, but called Mueller's performance "a high point of the Broadway season". Time Out New York gave the production four stars and said, "Waitress has an excellent ratio of sweet to tart; supporting characters who provide crustiness (Dakin Matthews's grumbly store owner) and flakiness (Christopher Fitzgerald's loony admirer of another waitress); and cooked-to-perfection staging by Diane Paulus. The whole dish is—please forgive me—love at first bite." David Rooney of The Hollywood Reporter'' said, "...the material is anchored at every step by Bareilles' melodious pop score and Mueller's supremely natural performance as Jenna. While the stock characters that surround her may be familiar, they're a winsome bunch played by sterling performers".

Awards and nominations

Original Broadway production

Original West End production

References

External links

Official UK site

2015 musicals
Broadway musicals
Musicals based on films
Works by Sara Bareilles